Philipp Ziereis (born 14 March 1993) is a German professional footballer who plays for LASK in the Austrian Football Bundesliga.

Career
Ziereis made his professional debut for SSV Jahn Regensburg during the second round of fixtures of the 2011–12 3. Liga season away to Werder Bremen II.

At the end of the 2012–13 season when Regensburg was relegated from the 2. Bundesliga, he joined FC St. Pauli.

Before the 2022–23 season, Ziereis signed a three-year contract with LASK in Austria.

Career statistics

Club

References

External links
 

1993 births
Living people
German footballers
Association football defenders
2. Bundesliga players
3. Liga players
Austrian Football Bundesliga players
SSV Jahn Regensburg players
FC St. Pauli players
LASK players
German expatriate footballers
Expatriate footballers in Austria
German expatriate sportspeople in Austria